Credential Recordings is a pop and rock record label in Nashville, Tennessee. The label branched out after a distribution agreement with Lowercase People Records for Switchfoot singer Jon Foreman's solo EPs, which tend to be more folk-acoustic in style. They also have agreements with the label to release its Switchfoot and Fiction Family releases to the Christian market.

Roster

Present
 Jon Foreman (since 2007)
 Fiction Family (since 2009, distribution agreement only)
 The New Respects (since 2016)

Past
 Dizmas (Moved to Forefront Records, then went on hiatus)
 Edison Glass (Disbanded)
 Future of Forestry (Active, currently unsigned)
 Lost Ocean (Active, currently unsigned)
 Sixpence None the Richer  (Active, currently unsigned)
 Turn Off the Stars (Disbanded)
 Patty Griffin (currently with New West Records)
 Seabird (Active, currently Independent)

Compilation albums
 Stereocilia Vol. 1 (June 10, 2006)
 The Tour EP (January 23, 2007)

Lowercase People Records
Credential Recordings handles the distribution for Switchfoot frontman Jon Foreman's solo EPs under an exclusive partnership with the band's label, Lowercase people records.

See also
List of record labels

References

Further reading

External links
MySpace page
PureVolume page

 
Record labels based in Nashville, Tennessee
American record labels
Christian record labels